Belgian coins may refer to:
Belgian franc - the old Belgian currency
Belgian euro coins - the Belgian euro coins
Euro gold and silver commemorative coins (Belgium) - commemorative coins of Belgium